The Pacific Basin Development Council is a non-profit organization that was established in early 1980s by the governors of the Northern Mariana Islands, American Samoa, Guam, and Hawaii.  The Council is concerned with the  economic and social development of the Pacific Islands, and conducts research and implements projects to that end.  The Pacific Basin Development Council is managed by a board of directors.

Withdrawal of Hawaii
In 1996, Governor Ben Cayetano withdrew Hawaii from the Pacific Basin Development Council as part of state budget cuts.  At that time, each of the four members of the Council paid annual dues of $63,000.

Sources
 Pacific Islands Institutions
 "Hawaii pulls out of Pacific Basin Council"

Non-profit organizations based in the United States
Economy of the Northern Mariana Islands
Economy of American Samoa
Economy of Guam
Business in Hawaii
1980s establishments in the United States
1980s establishments in Oceania